Hemichroa is a small genus of plants in the family Amaranthaceae containing three species.  It is endemic to Australia.

Description
Hemichroa is a genus of succulent, halophytic, perennial herbs and shrubs.  They are found coastally as well as in salt marshes and around inland salt lakes.

References

Amaranthaceae
Amaranthaceae genera
Succulent plants
Halophytes